Sten Ivar Ljunggren (born 16 October 1938) is a Swedish character actor. He played Henrik in the long-running Swedish drama TV series Svenska hjärtan, which aired between 1987 and 1998. Other notable roles includes criminal inspector Lennart Thorin in the TV mini-series based on the Lasermannen events, the retired doctor Axel Holtman in Skärgårdsdoktorn, the voice of Carl Fredricksen in the Swedish dub of Up, the voice of Sykes in the Swedish cinema dub of Oliver & Company, and the evil principal in Kenny Starfighter.

He played the lead role as Birger in Lukas Moodysson's last short film Talk. The same character, with some modifications, was used again in Moodysson's Together. Ljunggren reprised the role.

Selected filmography
2020 – Mirakel (TV series)
2011 – Någon annanstans i Sverige
2010 – Four More Years
2009 – The Temptation of St. Tony
2009 – Up (voice in Swedish dub)
2008 – Oskyldigt dömd (TV series)
2007 – Gone with the Woman2005 – Lasermannen (TV mini-series)
2004 – Lilla Jönssonligan på kollo2004 – Populärmusik från Vittula2000 – Together1999 – Deathly Compulsion1999 – Hälsoresan – En smal film av stor vikt1999 – The Prince of Egypt (voice in Swedish dub)
1999 – C/o Segemyhr (TV series)
1998–2000 – Pistvakt – En vintersaga (TV series)
1997 – Beck – Monstret1997 – Kenny Starfighter (TV series)
1997–2000 – Skärgårdsdoktorn (TV series)
1997 – Talk (short film)
1993–2001 – Rederiet (TV series)
1992 – The Best Intentions1988 – Oliver & Company (voice in Swedish dub)
1988 – S.O.S. – En segelsällskapsresa1987 – The Ninth Company1987–1998 – Svenska hjärtan (TV series)
1984 – Jönssonligan får guldfeber1978 – Lyftet''

References

External links

Living people
Swedish male television actors
Swedish male voice actors
Litteris et Artibus recipients
1938 births
Swedish male film actors